Death of a Gentle Lady is the twenty-fourth mystery novel in the Hamish Macbeth series by M. C. Beaton.  It was first published in 2008.

Plot introduction
While the rest of the town is smitten by Mrs. Gentle, Hamish Macbeth distrusts and dislikes her.  When she tries to close down his beloved station, he exacts his revenge and saves a beautiful woman from deportation at the same time by proposing to Gentle's maid Ayesha.  By the time the wedding day arrives, Hamish is desperate to escape marriage; when Ayesha doesn't appear and Mrs. Gentle is found dead, he escapes one disaster only to be swept into another.

References

External links 
 UK publisher Constable & Robinson

2008 British novels
British detective novels
British mystery novels
Hamish Macbeth series
Novels set in Highland (council area)